Raktabīja is an asura in Hinduism. According to the Puranas, he fought with Sumbha and Nisumbha against the goddesses Kali and Chandi, both forms of Durga. Raktabīja had acquired a boon from Shiva that whenever a drop of his blood fell on the ground, various Raktabījas would emerge from the spot, equivalent to his strength, form, and weapons.

Legend

Origin 

According to the Puranas, Raktabīja was, in his previous birth, Rambha, the son of Danu, the king of the asuras. Due to being childless, Rambha and his brother, Karambha, performed a penance to seek offspring. The brothers performed a tapas, with Rambha seated in the midst of five fires, and Karambha in the midst of water. Alarmed, Indra assumed the form of a makara and dragged Karambha into the depths, drowning him. Enraged, Rambha decided to offer his own head to the fires as a sacrifice. Agni appeared before him, and urged him to desist from performing suicide, denouncing it as a great sin. He offered Rambha a boon of his choice. Rambha desired to be blessed with a son who would be as effulgent as Agni, one who would conquer the three worlds, and be undefeatable by both the devas and the asuras. His wish granted, he procceded to visit Mālayakṣa, who had a number of beasts with him, and a pretty she-buffalo caught his eye, called Mahiṣī. A sexual union took place between them, and Mahiṣī became pregnant. At Yakṣamaṇḍala, a he-buffalo desired her, and fought Rambha, impaling him with his horns. A grieving Mahiṣī leapt into her husband's funeral pyre, and from the pyre rose Raktabīja, sometimes identified with Mahishasura himself, as in the Vamana Purana, whereas the Devi Bhagavata Purana states that Raktabīja emerged from the pyre as Rambha reborn, along with his brother, Mahishasura.

Battle 
The eighth chapter of the Devi Mahatmya narrates Durga's battle with Raktabīja as a part of her battle against the asuras Sumbha and Nisumbha, who had disenfranchised the devas from Svarga. After the deaths of Dhumralochana, Chanda and Munda, Sumbha sent Raktabīja to fight. Raktabīja was wounded, but his drops of blood falling on the ground created innumerable other Raktabījas, and hence Durga and the Matrikas struggled to defeat them. Durga issued the following instruction to Kali: 

Ultimately, even as every drop of the blood that streamed from the asura was consumed by Kali, Raktabīja was beheaded by Durga and her axe. 

According to popular folklore, after killing Raktabīja and most of his entire army, the goddess Kali went on to kill all creatures in a fury, but was timely intervened by Shiva who laid himself in her path. Striking his body, Kali was shaken and embarrassed, and took out her tongue. This act has been depicted in many Hindu paintings and portraits.

There are references of Kali not being created, but having sprung from Durga's forehead, as they were all the same goddess in different forms.

See also
 Rambha (asura)
 Chanda and Munda
 Sumbha and Nisumbha
 Mahishasura
 Dhumralochana
 Sugriva (asura)

References

External links
On the description of the war of Raktabija
On the killing of Raktabija
Dictionary of Hindu Lore and Legend by Anna Dhallapiccola
 Devi Mahatmya, Chapter 9000.

Asura

Hindu mythology